Tracy Weber may refer to:
 Tracy Weber (journalist)
 Tracy Weber (singer)